The 1929 New Mexico Lobos football team represented the University of New Mexico as an independent during the 1929 college football season. In their 10th season under head coach Roy W. Johnson, the Lobos compiled a 2–4–2 record. Jack Fish and James D. Wilson were the team captains.

Schedule

References

New Mexico
New Mexico Lobos football seasons
New Mexico Lobos football